In the mathematical subfield of numerical analysis, an M-spline is a non-negative spline function.

Definition

A family of M-spline functions of order k with n free parameters is defined by a set of knots t1  ≤ t2  ≤  ...  ≤  tn+k such that

 t1 = ... = tk
 tn+1 = ... = tn+k
 ti < ti+k for all i

The family includes n members indexed by i = 1,...,n.

Properties

An M-spline Mi(x|k, t) has the following mathematical properties

 Mi(x|k, t) is non-negative
 Mi(x|k, t) is zero unless ti ≤ x < ti+k
 Mi(x|k, t) has k − 2 continuous derivatives at interior knots tk+1, ..., tn−1
 Mi(x|k, t) integrates to 1

Computation

M-splines can be efficiently and stably computed using the following recursions:

For k = 1,

if ti ≤ x < ti+1, and Mi(x|1,t) = 0 otherwise.

For k > 1,

Applications

M-splines can be integrated to produce a family of monotone splines called I-splines.  M-splines can also be used directly as basis splines for regression analysis involving positive response data (constraining the regression coefficients to be non-negative).

References

Splines (mathematics)